On 29 January 2010, the IUCN Red List of Threatened Species identified 6,702 (5,913 Animalia (1 Annelida, 1,328 Arthropoda, 3,814 Chordata, 149 Cnidaria, 617 Mollusca, 3 Nemertina, 1 Onychophora), 780 Plantae, 9 Protista) data deficient species.

Lists of data deficient species

Animals
Amphibians — List of data deficient amphibians
Birds — List of data deficient birds
Fish — List of data deficient fishes
Invertebrates — List of data deficient invertebrates
Arthropods — List of data deficient arthropods
Insects — List of data deficient insects
Molluscs List of data deficient molluscs
Mammals — List of data deficient mammals
Reptiles — List of data deficient reptiles
Plants — List data deficient plants
Chromista/Protista — List of Chromista by conservation status (9 data deficient species)
Fungi — List of fungi by conservation status (1 data deficient species)

Older lists (IUCN 2009.2)
 Annelida — IUCN Red List data deficient species (Annelida)
 Chordata — IUCN Red List data deficient species (Chordata)
 Cnidaria — IUCN Red List data deficient species (Cnidaria)
 Nemertina — IUCN Red List data deficient species (Nemertina)
 Onychophora — IUCN Red List data deficient species (Onychophora)
 Protista — IUCN Red List data deficient species (Protista)

References
 IUCN 2009. IUCN Red List of Threatened Species, v2009.2. Source of the above list: online IUCN Red List. Retrieved d.d. 29 January 2010.